(Old Bridge) is a bridge at Cluses, a commune in the Haute-Savoie department in the Auvergne-Rhône-Alpes region in southeastern France. It spans the river Arve.

The current bridge was built in 1674 and restored in 1833. A graffito carved in stone mentions the name of the builder, Charles Barbier; the architect was François Guénot, who usually worked for Charles Emmanuel II, Duke of Savoy.

The bridge replaces an earlier structure, built during the Roman occupation, and rebuilt in the Middle Ages.

It has been a registered historic monument since 1975.

References

Further reading 

 

Bridges in France
Bridges completed in 1674